38th BSFC Awards
December 10, 2017

Best Film: 
Phantom Thread

The 38th Boston Society of Film Critics Awards, honoring the best in filmmaking in 2017, were given on December 10, 2017.

Winners

 Best Film:
 Phantom Thread
 Runner-up: The Shape of Water
 Best Director:
 Paul Thomas Anderson – Phantom Thread
 Runner-up: Guillermo del Toro – The Shape of Water
 Best Actor:
 Daniel Kaluuya – Get Out
 Runner-up: Timothée Chalamet – Call Me by Your Name
 Best Actress:
 Sally Hawkins – The Shape of Water
 Runner-up: Vicky Krieps – Phantom Thread
 Best Supporting Actor:
 Willem Dafoe – The Florida Project
 Runner-up: Sam Rockwell – Three Billboards Outside Ebbing, Missouri
 Best Supporting Actress:
 Laurie Metcalf – Lady Bird
 Runner-up: Allison Janney – I, Tonya
 Best Screenplay:
 Greta Gerwig – Lady Bird
 Runner-up: Jordan Peele – Get Out
 Best Original Score:
 Jonny Greenwood – Phantom Thread
 Runner-up: Alexandre Desplat – The Shape of Water
 Runner-up: Alex Somers – Dawson City: Frozen Time
 Best Animated Film:
 Coco
 Runner-up: Loving Vincent
 Best Foreign Language Film:
 The Square
 Runner-up: BPM (Beats per Minute)
 Best Documentary:
 Dawson City: Frozen Time
 Runner-up: Faces Places
 Best Cinematography:
 Hoyte van Hoytema – Dunkirk
 Runner-up: Roger Deakins – Blade Runner 2049
 Best Editing:
 David Lowery – A Ghost Story
 Runner-up: Tatiana S. Riegel – I, Tonya
 Best New Filmmaker:
 Jordan Peele – Get Out
 Best Ensemble Cast:
 The Meyerowitz Stories
 Runner-up: BPM (Beats per Minute)

External links
 2017 Winners

References

2017
2017 film awards
2017 awards in the United States
2017 in Boston
December 2017 events in the United States